Karl Eller (June 20, 1928 – March 10, 2019) was an American businessman and entrepreneur.

Early life 

Eller grew up in Tucson, Arizona. He played football collegiately at the University of Arizona where he was a member of the Phi Gamma Delta fraternity.

In 1962, Eller purchased the Arizona operations of New York-based billboard advertising company Foster & Kleiser and built it into a major regional business. As a result of the influence garnered by his leadership of this firm, Eller became one of the founding investors of the NBA's Phoenix Suns in 1968, and it was Eller's ownership group that hired future Suns owner Jerry Colangelo as its inaugural general manager.

Eller merged the outdoor advertising business with KTAR radio and television in 1968 to form Combined Communications, Inc., which was absorbed by Gannett in 1979. At its height, Combined Communications owned 7 major metropolitan television stations, 14 major metropolitan radio stations, 12 American and 2 Canadian outdoor advertising companies and two metropolitan daily newspapers.

Eller would later go on to become the head of Columbia Pictures Communications, during which he helped with its parent company's 1983 merger with The Coca-Cola Company, and of the convenience store chain Circle K, which was based in Phoenix during Eller's tenure as CEO (1983–1990). During that time, Eller built Circle K into the second largest convenience store operation and the largest publicly owned convenience store chain in the U.S. with 4,641 stores in 32 states and an additional 1,386 licensed or joint venture stores in thirteen foreign countries. Under his leadership, the company grew from annual sales of $747 million to $3.4 billion. Circle K then declared bankruptcy and Eller resigned in 1990.

Eller was inducted into the Advertising Hall of Fame by the American Advertising Federation in March 2004 in New York City. Eller is also the first Arizonan and second outdoor advertising executive to be elected to the Advertising Hall of Fame.

Karl Eller is the namesake of the Eller College of Management at the University of Arizona, where he was also an alumnus.

Articles
  Miracle in a Glass — (Feb. 1979) Karl Eller, then President of Combined Communications Corp., gives a speech on November 15, 1978, dealing with the free enterprise system.

Awards 
 Eller received the 2016 Heritage Award from the Arizona Chamber of Commerce and Industry.

Mentions
  Karl Eller's Big Thirst for Convenience Stores — (June 1988) Karl Eller, then Chairman of Phoenix, Arizona-based Circle K Corp., plans to mold Circle K into the industry's most aggressive, fastest-growing player.  The number of Circle K stores tripled to about 4,600 under Eller's leadership, and sales soared to $2.3 billion from $747.8 million.

References

External links 
Biography of Karl Eller from American Advertising Federation web site

1928 births
2019 deaths
Sportspeople from Chicago
Players of American football from Tucson, Arizona
Players of American football from Chicago
Arizona Wildcats football players
Phoenix Suns owners
Tucson High School alumni